KZRZ (98.3 FM, "Sunny 98.3") is an adult contemporary formatted radio station broadcasting in the Monroe, Louisiana, radio market. It is owned by Stephens Media Group, through licensee SMG-Monroe, LLC. The station began broadcasting February 29, 1968, as KUZN-FM, owned with KUZN (1310 AM). Studios are located in Monroe, and its transmitter is located near Sterlington, Louisiana.

The current Market Manager is Mike Downhour. Sunny 98.3 is home to Sheila Kay & Noah mornings 5am-10am.  Leslie Haze middays 10am- 3pm. John Runyan afternoons 3pm-7pm.  John Tesh Radio Show weekdays from 7pm to midnight.  All the music is programmed locally. Sunny 98.3 is home to the Santa Stop promotion where Santa makes his first seasonal appearance in late November.

Prior to 1993, 98.3 was urban contemporary KYEA K-98.

References

External links

Radio stations in Louisiana